Lake Saarijärvi is a medium-sized lake in Central Finland. Saarijärvi is a very common name of a lake in Finnish. There are 198 lakes with this name in Finland. The biggest of them is located in Saarijärvi municipality. The municipality is located between two lakes, Saarijärvi and Pyhäjärvi.

See also
List of lakes in Finland

References

Lakes of Saarijärvi